The 1941 Brooklyn Dodgers, led by manager Leo Durocher, won their first pennant in 21 years, edging the St. Louis Cardinals by 2.5 games. They went on to lose to the New York Yankees in the World Series.

In The New Bill James Historical Baseball Abstract, this team was referenced as one of "The Greatest Teams That Never Was", due to the quality of its starting lineup. Dolph Camilli was the slugging star with 34 home runs and 120 RBI. He was voted the National League's Most Valuable Player. Pete Reiser, a 22-year-old rookie, led the league in batting average, slugging percentage, and runs scored. Other regulars included Hall of Famers Billy Herman, Joe Medwick, Pee Wee Reese, and Dixie Walker. Not surprisingly, the Dodgers scored the most runs of any NL team (800).

The pitching staff featured a pair of 22-game winners, Kirby Higbe and Whitlow Wyatt, having their best pro seasons.

On July 1, the Dodgers played the Phillies in Brooklyn; the game was televised by WNBT in New York (now WNBC), making the contest the first program aired by a commercial TV station in the United States. Although the Dodgers would later win the pennant and the Phillies would finish dead last in the NL, Philadelphia won the game 6–4, in 10 innings.

Offseason 
 November 11, 1940: Vito Tamulis, Bill Crouch, Mickey Livingston and cash were traded by the Dodgers to the Philadelphia Phillies for Kirby Higbe.
 November 19, 1940: Tot Pressnell was purchased from the Dodgers by the St. Louis Cardinals.
 December 1940: Boze Berger was traded by the Dodgers to the New York Yankees for Jack Graham.
 December 4, 1940: Glen Stewart was purchased by the Dodgers from the New York Giants.
 December 4, 1940: Gus Mancuso, minor leaguer John Pintar and cash were traded by the Dodgers to the St. Louis Cardinals for Mickey Owen.
 December 9, 1940: Pep Young was traded by the Dodgers to the Cincinnati Reds for Lew Riggs.
 January 27, 1941: Pep Rambert was purchased by the Dodgers from the Pittsburgh Pirates.
 February 4, 1941: Lefty Mills was purchased by the Dodgers from the St. Louis Browns.
 Prior to 1941 season: Wally Westlake was acquired from the Dodgers by the Merced Bears.

Regular season

Season standings

Record vs. opponents

Notable transactions 
 April 3, 1941: Roxie Lawson was purchased by the Dodgers from the St. Louis Browns.
 April 15, 1941: Newt Kimball was purchased by the Dodgers from the St. Louis Cardinals.
 April 15, 1941: Lefty Mills was returned by the Dodgers to the St. Louis Browns.
 April 22, 1941: Mace Brown was purchased by the Dodgers from the Pittsburgh Pirates.
 May 6, 1941: Lee Grissom was traded by the Dodgers to the Philadelphia Phillies for Vito Tamulis.
 May 6, 1941: Johnny Hudson, Charlie Gilbert and cash were traded by the Dodgers to the Chicago Cubs for Billy Herman.
 August 14, 1941: Joe Becker, George Staller, and minor leaguers John S. Bell and Ray Roche were traded by the Dodgers to the Philadelphia Phillies for Dixie Howell.
 August 26, 1941: Mace Brown and cash were traded by the Dodgers to the Chicago Cubs for Augie Galan.

Roster

Player stats

Batting

Starters by position 
Note: Pos = Position; G = Games played; AB = At bats; R = Runs; H = Hits; Avg. = Batting average; HR = Home runs; RBI = Runs batted in; SB = Stolen bases

Other batters 
Note: G = Games played; AB = At bats; R = Runs; H = Hits; Avg. = Batting average; HR = Home runs; RBI = Runs batted in; SB = Stolen bases

Pitching

Starting pitchers 
Note: G = Games pitched; GS = Games started; CG = Complete games; IP = Innings pitched; W = Wins; L = Losses; ERA = Earned run average; BB = Bases on balls; SO = Strikeouts

Other pitchers 
Note: G = Games pitched; GS = Games started; CG = Complete games; IP = Innings pitched; W = Wins; L = Losses; ERA = Earned run average; BB = Bases on balls; SO = Strikeouts

Relief pitchers 
Note: G = Games pitched; IP = Innings pitched; W = Wins; L = Losses; SV = Saves; ERA = Earned run average; BB = Bases on balls; SO = Strikeouts

1941 World Series 

The 1941 World Series matched the New York Yankees against the Dodgers, with the Yankees winning in five games to capture their fifth title in six years, and their ninth overall.

The name "Subway Series" arose for a World Series played between two New York City teams. The series was punctuated by the Dodgers' Mickey Owen's dropped third strike of a sharply breaking curveball (a suspected spitball) pitched by Hugh Casey to Tommy Henrich in the 9th inning of Game 4. The play led to a Yankees rally and brought them one win away from another championship.

The Yankees were back after a one-year hiatus, having won thirteen (13) of their last fourteen (14) Series games and twenty-eight (28) of their last thirty-one (31) games in the World Series.

This was the first Subway Series between the Brooklyn Dodgers and New York Yankees, who had already faced the crosstown New York Giants five times, and the Series was now 1–0 in favor of the Bronx Bombers. These two teams would meet a total of seven (7) times from 1941–1956 – the Dodgers' only victory coming in 1955.

Game 1 
October 1, 1941, at Yankee Stadium in New York

Game 2 
October 2, 1941, at Yankee Stadium in New York

Game 3 
October 4, 1941, at Ebbets Field in Brooklyn, New York

Game 4 
October 5, 1941, at Ebbets Field in Brooklyn, New York

Game 5 
October 6, 1941, at Ebbets Field in Brooklyn, New York

Awards and honors 

1941 Major League Baseball All-Star Game
Whit Wyatt starter
Mickey Owen starter
Pete Reiser starter
Dolph Camilli reserve
Billy Herman reserve
Cookie Lavagetto reserve
Joe Medwick reserve
National League Most Valuable Player
Dolph Camilli
TSN Major League All-Star Team
Whit Wyatt
Pete Reiser
Dolph Camilli
TSN NL Most Valuable Payer
Dolph Camilli

League top ten finishers 
Dolph Camilli
 NL leader in home runs (34)
 NL leader in RBI (120)
 #2 in NL in slugging percentage (.556)
 #2 in NL in bases on balls (104)
 #3 in NL in on-base percentage (.407)

Kirby Higbe
 NL leader in wins (22)
 #4 in NL in strikeouts (121)

Joe Medwick
 #3 in NL in batting average (.318)
 #3 in NL in runs scored (100)

Pete Reiser
 NL leader in batting average (.343)
 NL leader in slugging percentage (.558)
 NL leader in runs scored (117)
 NL leader in triples (17)
 #4 in NL in on-base percentage (.406)

Whit Wyatt
 MLB leader in shutouts (7)
 NL leader in wins (22)
 #2 in NL in strikeouts (176)
 #2 in NL in ERA (2.34)
 #2 in NL in complete games (23)

Farm system 

LEAGUE CHAMPIONS: Montreal, Durham, Santa Barbara, Elizebethton, Newport

Notes

References 
Baseball-Reference season page
Baseball Almanac season page

External links 
1941 Brooklyn Dodgers uniform
Brooklyn Dodgers reference site
Acme Dodgers page 
Retrosheet

Los Angeles Dodgers seasons
Brooklyn Dodgers
National League champion seasons
Brooklyn
1940s in Brooklyn
Flatbush, Brooklyn